963 Iduberga is an S-type asteroid from the asteroid belt's background population. Its rotation period is 3.02 hours.

References

External links 
 
 

000963
Discoveries by Karl Wilhelm Reinmuth
Named minor planets
000963
19211026